All Quiet on the Noise Floor is the fourth studio album by American musician Jason Falkner, released in Japan on September 2, 2009 on Noise McCartney Records.

The album was exclusively released in Japan; a U.S. release was tentatively scheduled for the end of 2009 but never occurred. It has since seen digital release for download and streaming. One edition of the record included a DVD that featured a July 28, 2008 performance and "rehearsal footage with Quruli before the Fuji Rock Festival." All instruments on the album were played by Falkner.

Track listing

Personnel

Jason Falkner - vocals, instrumentation, noise, production, photography, engineering, mixing
Pete Lyman - mastering
Kazutoshi Chiba - executive production
Christy Hindenlang - photography
Personnel per AllMusic

Notes
A version of "Princessa" has been available for streaming on Falkner's Myspace page.
"My Home is Not a House" was previously recorded during Falkner's time with The Grays and is available on Necessity: The 4-Track Years.
"Jet Silver and the Dolls of Venus" is a cover of a Be-Bop Deluxe song.
"This Time" was originally released on Falkner's I'm OK, You're OK.

References

External links
All Quiet on the Noise Floor at Discogs (list of releases)

2009 albums
Jason Falkner albums